Manuel Maria Nogueira Capela (born 9 May 1922) was a Portuguese footballer who played as a goalkeeper.

Football career 
Capela gained 5 caps for Portugal and made his debut 5 January 1947 in Lisbon against Switzerland, in a 2-2 draw.

External links 
 
 

1922 births
Portuguese footballers
Association football goalkeepers
Primeira Liga players
C.F. Os Belenenses players
Associação Académica de Coimbra – O.A.F. players
Portugal international footballers
Possibly living people